The Seychelles sucker-tailed gecko or Seychelles surprise gecko (Urocotyledon inexpectata) is a species of lizard in the family Gekkonidae.
It is endemic to Seychelles.

Its natural habitats are subtropical or tropical dry forests, subtropical or tropical moist lowland forests, plantations, rural gardens, and urban areas.
It is threatened by habitat loss.

References

Fauna of Seychelles
Urocotyledon
Endemic fauna of Seychelles
Reptiles described in 1893
Taxonomy articles created by Polbot